Salix hookeriana is a species of willow known by the common names dune willow, coastal willow, and Hooker's willow.

Description
The leaves are up to 11 cm long, generally oval in shape, wavy along the edges, and hairy to woolly in texture with shiny upper surfaces.

The inflorescence is a catkin of flowers up to 9 cm long, with the female catkins growing longer as the fruits develop.

This willow may hybridize with similar species.

Taxonomy
The Latin specific epithet hookeriana refers to William Jackson Hooker, author of Flora Boreali-Americana in which the species was first published.

Distribution
The plant is native to the west coast of North America from Alaska to northern California, where it grows in coastal habitat such as beaches, marshes, floodplains, and canyons.

References

External links
 
 
 
 
 
 Jepson Manual Treatment: Salix hookeriana
 Washington Burke Museum

hookeriana
Flora of Alaska
Flora of British Columbia
Flora of the Northwestern United States
Flora of California
Flora without expected TNC conservation status